George Winston is an American pianist.

George Winston may also refer to:

George T. Winston (1852–1932), American educator
George Winston, character in the novella "Morality"
George Winston, the fictional United States Secretary of the Treasury in the Tom Clancy novel Executive Orders